Diana the Huntress is an oil-on-canvas painting by an anonymous artist of the School of Fontainebleau. Painted in about 1550, it is a mythical representation of Diane de Poitiers, the mistress of King Henry II, in the guise of the goddess Diana. It is in the Louvre, which acquired it in 1840.

In its linear elegance the painting exemplifies the French version of the Northern Mannerist style that was introduced to France by Italian artists such as Rosso Fiorentino and Francesco Primaticcio in the 1530s. It is one of many works by artists of the School of Fontainebleau depicting Diane de Poitiers, who was often personified as Diana, the Roman goddess of the hunt. The nude figure carries a bow and a quiver of arrows, and is accompanied by a dog. In her hair is an ornament in the shape of a crescent moon, an attribute of the goddess.

The painting was previously attributed to the Italian artist Luca Penni.

References

Bibliography

 , 
 
 

16th-century paintings
Mannerist paintings
Paintings in the Louvre by French artists
Paintings depicting Diana (mythology)
Dogs in art
Nude art